Wilcox County High School is a public high school in Rochelle, Georgia. United States. It is part of the Wilcox County School District.

Student culture 
Historically, students organized separate parties classified as proms; black and white students attended separate parent-organized proms which were not organized by the school administration. In 2012, a black student from the school was voted the Homecoming Queen; however, she did not purchase a ticket to the homecoming dance, but felt that she had been insulted because she was still expected to pay to participate in the privately funded dance. In 2013, students organized the first private racially integrated prom, and the school district announced that it would consider holding a school-sponsored integrated prom in 2014. The first school-organized prom was held in 2014, and the school has held a prom each year since.

Notable alumni 
 Alfonzo Dennard, former New England Patriots cornerback
 Bug Howard, Carolina Panthers wide receiver
 Nick Marshall, former Jacksonville Jaguars cornerback

References

External links 
 

Buildings and structures in Wilcox County, Georgia
Public high schools in Georgia (U.S. state)
School segregation in the United States
Education in Wilcox County, Georgia